Issue 1 is an expression which refers to the first issue of a publication such as a magazine, comic, or e-zine, and is also used to denote the initial direction or output of creativity.

Issue 1s are often sought for the following reasons:

 The sometimes "rough" or "unfinished" feel of a first issue, that results from the "bedding in" of the publication process and half-formed ideas, is appreciated by readers more than are subsequent issues.
 Much of the publication's content is explained from a clean slate - in comics, many strips contain a telling of the character's origin story.
 First issues of publications often have an increased market value, due to their perceived increased originality.

See also
First edition
Television pilot

Publishing